Donna Davis is an Australian politician currently serving as the Lord Mayor of the City of Parramatta.

Career
Prior to her election, Davis had also worked for a number of Federal and State Members of Parliament and had held positions in the former Department of Employment, Education and Training.

Davis was elected to City of Parramatta Council in 2017 following its amalgamation and was elected as its Lord Mayor on 10 January 2022. She was the third woman to hold the title.
Davis is a member of the Australian Labor Party and was announced as the party's endorsed candidate for the New South Wales state seat of Parramatta for the 2023 New South Wales state election.

Personal life
Davis has a degree in arts with Honours and resides with her husband Michael in the Dundas Valley. She was Yates Avenue Public School P&C President, had been involved in establishing funding for regional indigenous communities in Tasmania and had volunteered for the Cumberland Gang Show for seven years.

References 

Living people
Mayors and Lord Mayors of Parramatta
Year of birth missing (living people)